Cyclotelus is a genus of stiletto flies in the family Therevidae. There are more than 20 described species in Cyclotelus.

Species
These 29 species belong to the genus Cyclotelus:

 Cyclotelus achaetus (Malloch, 1932)
 Cyclotelus badicrusus Irwin & Webb, 1992
 Cyclotelus beckeri (Krober, 1911)
 Cyclotelus bellus (Cole, 1923)
 Cyclotelus brazilianus (Cole, 1960)
 Cyclotelus colei Irwin & Lyneborg, 1981
 Cyclotelus crassicornis Bellardi
 Cyclotelus diversipes (Krober, 1911)
 Cyclotelus extinctus (Walker, 1854)
 Cyclotelus fascipennis (Macquart, 1846)
 Cyclotelus femorata Krober, 1911
 Cyclotelus flavipes (Krober, 1928)
 Cyclotelus fulvipennis (Krober, 1928)
 Cyclotelus hardyi (Cole, 1960)
 Cyclotelus kroeberi (Cole, 1960)
 Cyclotelus laetus Walker, 1850
 Cyclotelus longicornis Krober, 1911
 Cyclotelus nigrifrons (Krober, 1914)
 Cyclotelus nigroflamma Walker, 1850
 Cyclotelus pictipennis (Wiedemann, 1821)
 Cyclotelus polita (Krober, 1911)
 Cyclotelus pruinosus Walker, 1850
 Cyclotelus ruficornis (Macquart, 1840)
 Cyclotelus rufiventris (Loew, 1869)
 Cyclotelus scutellaris (Walker, 1857)
 Cyclotelus silacrusus Irwin & Webb, 1992
 Cyclotelus socius Walker, 1850
 Cyclotelus sumichrasti (Bellardi, 1861)
 Cyclotelus vetusta Walker

References

Further reading

 

Therevidae
Articles created by Qbugbot
Asiloidea genera